Palawan is a province in the Philippines.

Palawan may also refer to:

Places
Palawan (island), an island in Palawan province, Philippines
Palawan State University, Philippines
Pulau Palawan, or Palawan Island, an island south of Singapore

Animals
Palawan binturong
Palawan fruit bat
Palawan hornbill
Palawan peacock-pheasant
Palawan stink badger
Palawan turtle

Other uses
Palawan people, indigenous ethnic group of the Palawan group of islands
Palawan, common name in the Philippines of Cyrtosperma merkusii, the giant swamp taro

See also

Pahlawan (disambiguation)
Palawa (disambiguation)
Palawano language
Palauan language
Micronesians#Palauans